The Roman Catholic Diocese of Le Havre (Latin: Dioecesis Portus Gratiae; French: Diocèse du Havre ) is a diocese of the Roman Catholic Church in France. Erected in 1974, the episcopal see is Le Havre Cathedral in the city of Le Havre. The diocese comprises the arrondissement of Le Havre in the department of Seine-Maritime, Normandy. 

The diocese was created from territory of the Archdiocese of Rouen, and remains suffragan to the parent diocese. 

The current bishop is Jean-Luc Brunin, appointed in 2011.

Bishops
Michel Marie Paul Saudreau (1974–2003)
Michel Jean Guyard (2003–2011) 
Jean-Luc Brunin (since 2011)

See also
 Catholic Church in France

References

External links
  Centre national des Archives de l'Église de France, L’Épiscopat francais depuis 1919, retrieved: 2016-12-24.
Catholic Hierarchy page 

Le Havre
Christian organizations established in 1974
Seine-Maritime
Roman Catholic dioceses and prelatures established in the 20th century
1974 establishments in France